Yadamah (يدمة) is one of the governorates in Najran Region, Saudi Arabia.

References 

Populated places in Najran Province
Najran Province governorates